The Offshore Raiding Craft (ORC) is a small, fast boat used by the Royal Marines for troop insertion, and patrols. The ORC is primarily used when undertaking strategic raiding missions, where speed and covertness is desired. However, it is equally capable when conducting larger scale amphibious operations alongside the larger and more traditional LCACs, LCUs and LCVPs. 

There are two variants of the ORC:
 Mid Console Variant (MCV),  the Fire Support Variant
 Aft Console Variant (ACV),  the Troop Carrying Variant

See also
List of active Royal Marines military watercraft
Combat Rubber Raiding Craft

References

External links
Royal Marines - Landing Craft (royalnavy.mod.uk)
Video - HMS Bulwark - Offshore Raiding Craft (youtube.com)

Amphibious warfare vessels of the United Kingdom
Landing craft
Royal Marines
Military boats